Of Magic Illusions is the first full-length album by the Norwegian band Ancestral Legacy, released on 1 July 2005 under Magik Art Entertainment. Originally was a self-released demo album from April 2003.

Background 
The album includes three bonus tracks taken from the 2002 demo Emptiness,  plus an extra track from the Of Magic Illusions recording session: “Enveloped” a cover of the Finnish band Rapture, from the album Songs For The Withering (2002). A music video was made for the track "Crash of Silence".

Track listing

(*)Tracks 9 - 12 appears only on the 2005 Re-release on Magik Art. "Cross The Sea" is an edit version of the original track.

Personnel

Ancestral Legacy 
Elin Anita Omholt - Female Vocals
Eddie Risdal - Harsh Vocals/Guitars
Tor Arvid Larsen - Guitars
Anton Dead aka Atle Johansen - Bass
Børre Iversen - Drums

Production and Engineering 
Eddie Risdal -	Mixing, Songwriting, Photography
Cato Pedersen - Photography, Cover art

External links 
Discogs.com
Metallum Archives

2005 debut albums
Ancestral Legacy albums